The 1989–90 Marquette Warriors men's basketball team represented Marquette University during the 1989–90 men's college basketball season. Their head coach was Kevin O'Neill. The Golden Eagles finished the regular season with a record of 15–14, 9—5. This was the first year in which Marquette played in the Midwestern Collegiate Conference.

Guard Tony Smith was the team's leading scorer with 689 points and 225 assists in 29 games. Other statistical leaders included Forward Trevor Powell with 158 rebounds.

Roster

Schedule

Team players drafted into the NBA

References 

Marquette
Marquette Golden Eagles men's basketball seasons
Marquette
Marquette
Marquette